Fazal-ur-Rehman is a Jatiya Party (Ershad) politician and the former Member of Parliament of Kishoreganj-3.

Career
Fazal-ur-Rehman was elected to parliament from Kishoreganj-3 as a Jatiya Party candidate in 1986 and 1988. He is the President of Kishoreganj District unit of Bangladesh Nationalist Party.

References

Jatiya Party politicians
Living people
3rd Jatiya Sangsad members
Year of birth missing (living people)